Hubertus von Beyer (26 March 1912 – 23 October 1974) was an Austrian writer. playwright, film script editor, and co-founder of the German Academy for Poetry and Language Arts in Darmstadt, Germany.  His work was part of the literature event in the art competition at the 1936 Summer Olympics.

References

1912 births
1974 deaths
20th-century Austrian male writers
Olympic competitors in art competitions
Writers from Vienna